The Midland Football Alliance was an English association football league for semi-professional teams. It covered Leicestershire, Shropshire, Staffordshire, Warwickshire, West Midlands, Worcestershire and also southern parts of Derbyshire and Nottinghamshire. The league consisted of a single division which sat at Step 5 of the National League System, or the ninth level of the overall English football league system.

The league was formed in 1994, drawing its initial membership from the strongest clubs in the Midland Football Combination and the West Midlands (Regional) League, both of which became feeder leagues to the new competition. Each season, the champion club of each feeder league was eligible for promotion to the Alliance, and Alliance clubs could in turn be relegated to the feeder leagues. Successful teams in the Alliance were eligible for promotion to a Step 4 league, either the Southern League or Northern Premier League depending on geographical considerations.  The league merged with the Midland Combination in 2014 to form the new Midland Football League.

History
The Alliance was formed in 1994, taking its initial member clubs from the West Midlands (Regional) League and the Midland Football Combination, which had existed since before the Second World War, having originally been formed as the Birmingham & District League and the Worcestershire Combination respectively. Their catchment areas had gradually converged, and by the early 1990s the standard of play and geographical coverage of the two competitions were considered to be similar enough that a new competition was formed to cater for the best clubs previously split across the two leagues.

The league drew ten member clubs from each of the two leagues for its inaugural season. The clubs selected to join from the Midland Combination were Barwell, Boldmere St Michaels, Bolehall Swifts, Pershore Town, Sandwell Borough, Shepshed Dynamo, Shifnal Town, Stapenhill, Stratford Town and West Midlands Police. Those selected from the West Midlands (Regional) League were Brierley Hill Town, Chasetown, Halesowen Harriers, Hinckley Athletic, Knypersley Victoria, Oldbury United, Paget Rangers, Rocester, Rushall Olympic and Willenhall Town. Paget Rangers won the first league championship by a margin of 12 points from Hinckley Athletic in the 1994–95 season, and gained promotion to the Southern League. The Alliance's status as a feeder to the Southern League was cemented when Armitage 90 were relegated in the opposite direction. Armitage went on to dominate the league in the 1995–96 season but disbanded midway through the season, with the result that their record was expunged from the table.

For the 1999–2000 season the league increased in size to 22 clubs when two clubs were promoted into the Alliance but none relegated out of it. One of the promoted clubs was Oadby Town of the Leicestershire Senior League, the first time a team from that league had been promoted into the Alliance. Two years later, the league increased in size to 23 clubs as more teams joined than left, but Stapenhill resigned midway through the 2001–02 season, reverting the number of clubs in the competition back to 22. The league expanded to 24 clubs for the 2003–04 season, at the end of which, for the first time, Alliance clubs were promoted to the Northern Premier League, rather than the Southern League, when Rocester and Willenhall Town joined the more northerly of the two leagues. The following season Coalville Town became the first Alliance team to reach the first round proper of the FA Cup, a feat which was repeated in the 2005–06 season by both Chasetown and Leamington.

With the creation of the National League System by the Football Association the league was officially defined as a Step 5 league. The champions of the Midland Combination, West Midlands (Regional) League and Leicestershire Senior League continued to gain promotion to the Alliance, although in 2008 the new East Midlands Counties Football League was formed at the Step 6 level and it was anticipated that successful teams from the Leicestershire Senior League, which is officially a Step 7 league, would now move up to the new league and that the champions of the new league would in turn move up to the Alliance if they fell within its coverage area.

In 2014 the Alliance merged with the Midland Combination to form the new Midland Football League.  The clubs which had been members of the Alliance formed the Premier Division of the new league.

Structure
The Alliance was known under various sponsored names following deals with companies including Baker-Joiner, Polymac Services, Harvey World Travel, Travel Factory, and Aspire. In July 2008, it was announced that 23 teams would compete in the Alliance in the 2008–09 season, however the following week it was announced that Stapenhill had folded, leaving 22 teams in the league. The league was contested on a double round-robin basis, with each team playing each of the other teams in the division once at home and once away. Three points were awarded for a win, one for a draw and zero for a defeat. Goal difference was used to separate teams on the same points.

As the Alliance was a Step 5 league, its member clubs were eligible to take part in the FA Cup and FA Vase as long as their grounds met the required standards. The league also operated two cup competitions of its own, the knock-out League Cup, which was staged every season, and the Joe McGorian Cup, which was contested between the previous season's League Cup winners and league champions and which was first contested in 1996.

According to official FA regulations, clubs from the Alliance were eligible for promotion to a Step 4 league, provided their grounds met the required standard.  Clubs promoted from Step 5 leagues were placed in the most geographically appropriate Step 4 leagues as determined by the FA's Leagues Committee.  The number of clubs promoted from the Alliance each season could vary, as regulations stated that the "ten most suitable clubs from the leagues at Step 5" will gain promotion. All clubs gaining promotion from the Alliance were placed in either the Southern League or the Northern Premier League. Teams finishing at the bottom of the Alliance table could be relegated to an appropriate feeder league, depending on the number of teams remaining in the division after other promotion and relegation issues have been resolved.

Attendance

Attendances at Midland Alliance matches were generally small, with many matches attracting fewer than 100 spectators. In the 2006–07 season the average attendance across the league was 124, but in the 2007–08 season this fell to 87. The best supported team in that season was Atherstone Town, whose average home attendance was 162. The worst supported team was Oldbury United whose matches drew an average of only 39 spectators. The highest attendance for a single match was 411, for the match between Stratford Town and Barwell. Barwell also took part in the match with the lowest attendance, when their game away to Oldbury United drew only 20 spectators.

The largest crowd ever registered for an Alliance match was 1,280, for the match between Racing Club Warwick and local rivals Leamington on 26 December 2005. The smallest crowd recorded was 10, for a match between Wednesfield and Biddulph Victoria on 19 April 2003.

Champions and cup-winners 

The league champions and clubs promoted from the league were as follows:

The winners of the Alliance's two cup competitions were as follows:

Member clubs
A total of 65 clubs played in the Midland Football Alliance:

References

External links
Official website

 
1994 establishments in England
Defunct football leagues in England
Sports leagues established in 1994